The Château du Jonchet is a French Renaissance château located on the banks of the Aigre River in the former commune of Romilly-sur-Aigre (which merged into the new commune of Cloyes-les-Trois-Rivières in 2017) in the Eure-et-Loir department in the region of Centre-Val de Loire, in northern France.

The château was built in the sixteenth century, before being completely transformed by the King's architect Gabriel de Lestrade in the eighteenth century. The château was restored by Fernand Pouillon before it was owned by Roger Bellon and Hubert de Givenchy, who owned the château until his death in 2018.

The château has been designated as a partially protected historical monument since 18 October 1984.

History
The French Renaissance-style château dates from the sixteenth century. In the 18th century, it was transformed by the King's architect Gabriel de Lestrade, who notably built the staircase of Louis-Hilaire du Bouchet, Comte de Sourches. Lestrade, a collaborator of the King's architect, Ange-Jacques Gabriel, later built the Château de Sourches for Louis II of Bouchet de Sourches, Marquis de Sourches, Comte de Montsoreau, Grand Prévôt de France, Prévôt de l'hôtel du Roi.

The château later became the property of Count Lionel de Tarragon (uncle of the sculptor Cyril de La Patellière). Following the end of World War II, the château was badly damaged during the 1950s, but was completely restored by its next owner, the architect Fernand Pouillon. The château then became the property of Roger Bellon, owner of the French pharmaceutical house Laboratoire Roger Bellon, and mayor of Romilly-sur-Aigre. Aristotle Onassis and his partner Maria Callas considered purchasing the château shortly in the early 1960s around the time his divorce was finalized from his first wife Tina.

Givenchy years
In the early 1970s, the château was acquired by the French couturier Count Hubert de Givenchy (a younger son of Lucien Taffin de Givenchy, Marquis of Givenchy), who owned it with his partner Philippe Venet, until Givenchy's death in 2018. Under Givenchy's ownership, the property featured "labyrinthine boxwood hedges and topiary inspired by the monastery of San Giorgio in Venice, a rose garden designed by the late Bunny Mellon, a greenhouse, an artificial lake, a private chapel, a moat filled with water from the Loire, an indoor pool, and a dog cemetery."

The monument has been classified as a historical monument since October 8, 1984.

References
Notes

Sources

See also 
List of châteaux in Eure-et-Loir

External links

Chez Givenchy: Le Jonchet Revisited

Jonchet
Monuments historiques of Eure-et-Loir